The  Arizona Cardinals season was the franchise's 105th season, 84th season in the National Football League and the 16th in Arizona. The team was unable to improve upon their previous output of 5–11, instead winning only four games, although this was not considered a disaster as before their win over the Packers there was talk the 2003 Cardinals would become the first NFL team to go 0–16. For the fifth consecutive season, the franchise failed to reach the playoffs, and based on point differential had the worst record in the only NFL season where every team won at least four games. This resulted in the Cardinals firing head coach Dave McGinnis and replacing him with Dennis Green.  In his NFL debut, Anquan Boldin had 217 receiving yards.

Offseason

Draft

Personnel

Staff

Roster

Regular season

Schedule

Note: Intra-division opponents are in bold text.

Game summaries

Week 2

Week 17

The Cardinals overcame an 11-point deficit late in the fourth quarter to knock the Vikings out of a playoff berth.

Standings

Awards and honors
 Anquan Boldin, Associated Press Offensive Rookie of the Year

References

Arizona Cardinals seasons
Arizona Cardinals
Arizona